Magna International Inc. is a Canadian parts manufacturer for automakers. It is one of the largest companies in Canada and was recognized on the 2020 Forbes Global 2000. The company is the largest automobile parts manufacturer in North America by sales of original equipment parts, it has ranked consistently in the Fortune Global 500 list for 20 years in a row since 2001. It produces automotive systems, assemblies, modules, and components, which are supplied to General Motors, Ford and Stellantis, as well as BMW, Mercedes, Volkswagen, Toyota, Tesla, and Tata Motors, among others.

The company is headquartered in Aurora, Ontario, and its chief executive officer is Swamy Kotagiri. It has 158,000 employees in 342 manufacturing operations and 91 product development, engineering and sales centres in 27 countries. Magna is governed under a corporate constitution which calls for distribution of profits to employees and shareholders. The terms of this contract are a "fair enterprise system" according to company founder Frank Stronach.

History
In 1957, Frank Stronach founded Multimatic Investments Ltd in a tool-and-die rented garage out of Toronto. Its first automotive industry contract for metal sun visor brackets was with General Motors in 1959.

By the late 1960s, the company was operating in eight plants. Stronach took Multimatic Investments public in 1969 through a merger with Magna Electronics Corporation, an aerospace, defence and industrial components company, and became known as Magna International in 1973.

The company developed an employee equity participation and profit-sharing program in 1974. By 1981, Magna had sold its aerospace and defence operations to focus on the automotive industry. It began decentralizing major systems into independent, publicly-traded companies during the 1990s, while expanding into Asia.

Magna began designing automotive rearview cameras for Hummers in 2005 on its production line in Michigan, which were not a federal requirement at the time. It was one of the first to develop rearview cameras for automakers, and had a 350,000 unit contract by 2007. The company has produced more than 46 million components and opened a $66.5 million plant to produce cameras and driver-assistance components.

In February 2015, Samsung SDI agreed to purchase the battery pack business from Magna Steyr, an Austrian operating unit of Magna International, for $120 million. Magna International partnered with Argus Cyber Security after joining in a 2015 Series B funding round to access the company's security technology. The company sold its interiors business, which includes door and instrument panels, overhead systems and cargo management parts, to Grupo Antolin in August 2015. The sale to Grupo Antolin included 36 plants and 12,000 employees in Europe, North America and Asia, about 10 percent of the Magna's global workforce at the time. The operations generated sales of $2.4 billion in 2014.

In March 2018, Magna announced they will work together with the ride-share company Lyft to supply high-tech kits that turn vehicles into self-driving cars. The company invested $200 million into the project and both parties will jointly own the intellectual property developed. It was also noted that Magna will be Lyft's exclusive supplier of self-driving kits. Magna announced a partnership with BAIC Group in June 2018 to develop "next-generation" smart electric vehicles for Chinese consumers. In October 2020, it was announced that Walker would retire as CEO at the end of 2020, with Swamy Kotagiri replacing him January 2021. As of January 4, 2021 Swamy Kotagiri is now the CEO of Magna International.

In February 2021, the office of the governor of the state of Michigan announced that Magna plans to open a facility in the city of St. Clair to build battery enclosures for the 2022 GMC Hummer electric pickup. The battery enclosures will be produced at General Motors' facility in Detroit and Hamtramck. The new facility is expected to cost $70 million and to create over 300 jobs for the state.

Corporate affairs
Magna International is headquartered in Aurora, Ontario, and has 342 manufacturing operations and 91 product development, engineering and sales centres in 27 countries. Its United States operations are headed out of Troy, Michigan with its European head office in Vienna, Austria. Donald J. Walker was its chief executive officer and was working with Magna since 1987 until 2021.

Magna is governed under a corporate constitution, and requires consensus from management, shareholders and employees to make any changes. The company shares 10 percent of pretax profits with its employees. As of 2019, the company has 158,000 employees.

Acquisitions
In 2002, Magna International announced that it had reached an agreement with DaimlerChrysler to acquire its Austrian-based Eurostar Automobilwerk operation.

Magna acquired 80% of New Venture Gear, once a joint venture between General Motors and Chrysler, in September 2004, and combined it into Magna Powertrain. It assumed full ownership in 2007, closing the operation in August 2012.

Magna purchased CTS Fahrzeug-Dachsysteme, a supplier of convertible roofs, from Porsche in November 2005.

In July 2015, Magna bought the German company Getrag, which was one of the largest suppliers of automotive transmissions worldwide for $1.9 billion. The acquisition worked to increase growth potential in the Chinese market.

In 2018, the company acquired Haptronik GmbH, a German motion control software developer, OLSA S.p.A., an Italian automotive lighting manufacturer, and Viza Geca SL, a Spanish automotive seating company. It partnered with Innoviz Technologies to produce solid-state lidar for autonomous vehicles for BMW Group.

Magna acquired Boston startup Optimus Ride and its >120 employees in January 2022.

In December 2022, it was announced Magna has acquired the Stockholm-headquartered Veoneer Active Safety business from SSW Partners for $1.52 billion USD.

Technology
During its history, Magna International has worked with automakers to advance vehicle safety and technology such as smart mobility seating systems including stow-into-floor minivan seats, exterior systems including reaction injection moulding (RIM) bumpers, advanced driver assistance systems (ADAS), blind-spot detection and lane departure warning systems. The company is the largest automobile parts supplier in North America and the third largest worldwide.

It uses mobility technology to develop customized computing for fully automated driving systems. In 2018, it introduced an Icon radar system to help automakers reach Level 5 autonomy as well as automatic emergency braking systems. Magna has partnered with BMW on electrification to produce electric cars on a contract basis. The company is also known for using new materials for "lightweighting" vehicles. Goldman Sachs has reported that automated features developed by suppliers such as Magna will produce a 42 percent compound annual growth rate in global revenue over the next decade.

References

External links
 

 
1957 establishments in Ontario
Aurora, Ontario
Auto parts suppliers of Canada
Automotive companies established in 1957
Canadian brands
Canadian companies established in 1957
Companies based in the Regional Municipality of York
Companies listed on the New York Stock Exchange
Companies listed on the Toronto Stock Exchange
Multinational companies headquartered in Canada
S&P/TSX 60